From statehood in 1867 until 1883, Nebraska had only one congressional district.  Its representative was elected at-large statewide.

In 1883, after the 1880 census, Nebraska was apportioned more representatives who were elected from geographically based districts, thereby obviating the need for an at-large representative.

List of members representing the district

References

 Congressional Biographical Directory of the United States 1774–present

At-large
Former congressional districts of the United States